, provisional designation ,  is a trans-Neptunian object of the scattered disc, orbiting the Sun in the outermost region of the Solar System. It has a diameter of approximately 400 kilometers.

It was discovered on 11 November 2010, by American astronomers David Rabinowitz, Megan Schwamb and Suzanne Tourtellotte at ESO's La Silla Observatory site in northern Chile, when it was 38 AU from the Sun.

Orbit and classification 

 orbits the Sun at a distance of 34.3–266.6 AU once every 1846 years (674,262 days; semi-major axis of 150.5 AU). Its orbit has a high eccentricity of 0.77 and an inclination of 5° with respect to the ecliptic. Small number statistics suggest that this body may be trapped in a 3:2 orbital resonance with an unseen planet beyond Neptune with a semi-major axis of 195–215 AU. The first precovery was taken by the Sloan Digital Sky Survey at the Apache Point Observatory in 1998, extending the body's observation arc by 12 years prior to its discovery. The precoveries were found in May 2015.

Physical characteristics 

The light-curve gave a rotation period of  hours with a brightness variation of 0.18 magnitude.

Diameter and albedo 

While American astronomer Michael E. Brown assumes a diameter of 471 kilometers and an albedo of 0.07, the Johnston Archive estimates a diameter of 443 kilometers with generic albedo of 0.09. The Collaborative Asteroid Lightcurve Link assumes an albedo of 0.10 and calculates a diameter of 401 kilometers. These estimates are based on an absolute magnitude between 5.0 and 5.3.

Naming 

As of 2018, this minor planet remains unnamed.

See also 
 List of Solar System objects by greatest aphelion

References

External links 
 List Of Centaurs and Scattered-Disk Objects, Minor Planet Center
 Asteroid Lightcurve Database (LCDB), query form (info )
 Discovery Circumstances: Numbered Minor Planets (445001)-(450000) – Minor Planet Center
 
 

445473
445473
Discoveries by David L. Rabinowitz
Discoveries by Megan E. Schwamb
Discoveries by Suzanne W. Tourtellotte
445473
20101111